Paul Anthony Wotton (born 17 August 1977) is an English former professional footballer who is the manager of Truro City.

Having begun his career with his home-town side, Wotton went on to become the club's most successful captain as they won two Football League titles in three seasons. By the time he left Plymouth in 2008, Wotton had broken into the top ten of the club's all-time appearance list – playing in more than 400 matches – and won their Player of the Year award twice. A year later, he was inducted into the club's Hall of Fame.

Wotton went on to spend three seasons with Southampton, with whom he won the Football League Trophy at Wembley Stadium during the 2009–10 season. Towards the end of his time with the club, he was loaned out to Oxford United and Yeovil Town before joining the latter permanently. A year later, Wotton returned to Plymouth Argyle. He was appointed player-coach at Argyle at the end of the 2013–14 season and formally retired from playing the following year.

Renowned for his leadership and powerful shot, Wotton played at both centre half and defensive midfield and was considered a specialist at set pieces. Wotton also got recognised as for all but one of his seasons at Plymouth, he had worn the no.15 shirt. "It was my first squad number. I came in for pre-season while I was in a contract dispute with the club. I was raging. I thought, me being me, if you weren't (numbers) 1–11, you weren't fancied. I was really disappointed because I was a regular in the team. When I came back and things went really well, I just stayed (number) 15."

Playing career

Plymouth Argyle
Wotton was born in Plymouth, Devon, and started his playing career with his hometown club. His first season for Plymouth Argyle was also his first as a professional, under Steve McCall in 1994–95. After Argyle were relegated from the Second Division at the end of the 1997–98 season following defeat at Burnley he famously vowed that he would be part of the side that won promotion, and captained the side to the title with a record 102 points in 2001–02 whilst being named in the PFA Division Three team of the year. Two seasons later he again lifted some silverware, this time the Division Two championship. He was named the player of the season for Argyle for the following 2004–05 season, in which the team finished 17th. He appeared in the famous Jimmy Glass game against Carlisle, in which the goalkeeper scored in the 94th minute to keep Carlisle United in the Football League.

Wotton could be described as a solid and mature defender with a ferocious shot taking ability that resulted in him taking the majority of free-kicks and penalties during his first spell at Argyle. Playing at centre back during Argyle's Third and Second Division championship winning seasons, his slight lack of pace meant that in the Championship he usually played holding midfield role in front of the defence. He was the top-scorer in 2004–05 with 12 league goals, an excellent return for a non-striker, and again in 2005–06 with 8 goals.

In the summer of 2006, he was involved in an incident with young striker Chris Zebroski during a pre-season tour of Austria, which required Wotton to have more than a hundred stitches in his head. Zebroski was sacked less than a month later, having been found guilty of gross misconduct.

In the Championship match against Hull City on 9 December 2006 he damaged his cruciate and medial ligaments to his left knee and missed the rest of the 2006–07 Championship season. He returned from injury in time for Paul Sturrock's return to the club as manager, and after making a handful of substitute appearances he returned to the side for his first start in 15 months in the 2–1 win at Bristol City on 15 March 2008. He later went on to score a penalty in his final ever game for Plymouth against Preston North End, shortly before being released.

His autobiography, My Journey: The First Ten Years, was published in 2004.

Southampton

In June 2008, Wotton was released by Plymouth. On 18 June he joined Southampton. In his first start he came up against former club Plymouth's archrivals, Exeter City, in the first round of a League Cup match that Southampton comfortably won 3–1.

In March of the 2009-10 season, Wotton got his first taste of silverware away from Argyle, when he played in central midfield for 85 minutes of the 2010 Football League Trophy Final, winning 4–1 against Carlisle United.

On 8 November 2010, he joined Oxford United until the end of December on an emergency loan. On 31 December 2010, Wotton joined Yeovil Town on a one-month loan.

Yeovil Town
On 1 January 2011, Wotton made his debut for Yeovil away in a 0–0 draw to his old side Plymouth, for whom he played for 13 years clocking up nearly 400 appearances, and he received a standing ovation from the Argyle fans when his name was called out on the PA system. He played the full 90 minutes as the two sides played out a 0–0 draw. On 28 January 2011, Wotton's contract with Southampton was terminated "by mutual consent", and he made a permanent move to Huish Park on an 18-month contract. He scored his first Yeovil goal in the 2–1 win away to Brentford; a characteristic free kick from 25 yards out.

On 12 January 2012, his contract was cancelled by mutual consent.

Return to Argyle
Wotton rejoined Plymouth Argyle later that day, three and a half years after being released when the club were in the Championship. He signed an 18-month contract. "Paul has got a lot of experience, has a good knowledge of the game, he's determined and has a real will to win. We are pleased to have him on board," said manager Carl Fletcher. "When I spoke to Paul about coming back he made it clear he would have walked here on broken glass." Wotton made a winning return to the Argyle side as they defeated Burton Albion 2–1 at Home Park on 14 January.

At the end of the 2013–14 season, Wotton signed a new one-year contract to become a player-coach at Home Park replacing Gary Owers who had left the club. Wotton at this point was Argyle's second highest appearance maker on 491 games, but still some way behind Kevin Hodges.

Wotton formally retired from playing on 15 May 2015, having not played for the entirety of the 2014-15 season. Wotton's last competitive game for the club was in a 3–3 draw with Portsmouth, on the final day of the 2013-14 season.

Coaching career
New Argyle manager Derek Adams kept Wotton on as first-team coach at Argyle for the 2015-16 season, with Adams stating that he needed someone on board who knew the club. Wotton became a main-stay as a staff member under Adams, and for the 2017-18 season took on management duties for Argyle's Central League South team.

On 8 May 2018, it was announced that Wotton would step up to the role of assistant manager for the 2018–19 season, following the departure of Craig Brewster. On 28 April 2019, Wotton and Adams were both sacked by Argyle with the club in the League One relegation zone with one game left of the season, following a 5–1 defeat at Accrington Stanley. Wotton's dismissal came hours after he completed the London Marathon.

On 4 July 2019, it was announced that Wotton had agreed to become the manager of Truro City of the Southern League Premier Division South.

Career statistics

Honours
Plymouth Argyle
Football League Third Division: 2001–02
Football League Second Division: 2003–04

Southampton
Football League Trophy: 2009–10

Individual
PFA Third Division Team of the Year: 2001–02
Plymouth Argyle Player of the Season: 2002–03
Plymouth Argyle Player of the Season: 2004–05

References

External links

1977 births
Footballers from Plymouth, Devon
Living people
English footballers
Association football defenders
Association football midfielders
Plymouth Argyle F.C. players
Southampton F.C. players
Oxford United F.C. players
Yeovil Town F.C. players
English Football League players
Plymouth Argyle F.C. non-playing staff
Truro City F.C. managers
English football managers